Marriage (German: Heiratsfieber) is a 1928 Austrian-German silent comedy film directed by Rudolf Walther-Fein and starring Hans Junkermann, Fritz Kampers and Maria Paudler.

Hans Ledersteger worked on designing the film's sets.

Cast
 Hans Junkermann as Vincenz Jaromir, Graf von Staßwiedel  
 Fritz Kampers as Seppl Häusinger  
 Maria Paudler as Loni Miersbacher  
 Vivian Gibson as Hedda Collani  
 Franz Kammauf as Alois Loibner  
 Hans Waldemar as Dr. Hüsing  
 Otto Wögerer as Der Förster

References

Bibliography
 Gerhard Lamprecht. Deutsche Stummfilme: 1927-1931.

External links

1928 films
Films of the Weimar Republic
German silent feature films
Austrian silent feature films
Films directed by Rudolf Walther-Fein
German black-and-white films
1928 comedy films
Austrian comedy films
German comedy films
Silent comedy films
1920s German films